Saïd Amir Arjomand (Persian: سعید امیر ارجمند, b. 26 December, 1946) is an Iranian-American scholar and Distinguished Service Professor of Sociology at Stony Brook University, Long Island, and Director of the Stony Brook Institute for Global Studies. He received his Ph.D. in 1980 from the University of Chicago.

Arjomand is the founder and former president of the Association for the Study of Persianate Societies (ASPS) and founding Editor of the Journal of Persianate Studies.

Works

Books
 The Shadow of God and the Hidden Imam: Religion, Political Organization and Societal Change in Shi'ite Iran from the Beginning to 1890, the University of Chicago Press, 1984
 The Turban for the Crown: The Islamic Revolution in Iran, Oxford University Press, 1988
 The Political Dimensions of Religion, edited with an introduction, State University of New York Press, 1993
 Rethinking Civilizational Analysis, edited with Edward A. Tiryakian, London: Sage Publishers, 2004
 Constitutionalism and Political Reconstruction, edited with an introduction, Leiden: E.J. Brill, 2007
 Constitutional Politics in the Middle East, edited with an introduction, London: Hart Publishers, 2008
 After Khomeini, Iran under his Successors, Oxford University Press, 2009
 The Rule of Law, Islam and Constitutional Politics in Egypt and Iran, edited with Nathan J. Brown, State University of New York Press, 2013
 Worlds of Difference, co-edited, Sage, 2013
 Social Theory and Regional Studies in the Global Age, edited, SUNY Press, 2013
 Revolution: Structure and Meaning in World History, the University of Chicago Press, 2019

Selected articles
 Religious Human Rights and the Principle of Legal Pluralism in the Middle East, in J. van der Vyver and J. Witte, eds., Religious Human Rights in Global Perspective, Vol. 2: Legal Perspectives, M. Nijhoff, 1995, pp. 331–347.
 Unity and Diversity in Islamic Fundamentalism, in M. Marty and R.S. Appleby, eds., Fundamentalisms Comprehended, the University of Chicago Press, 1995, pp. 179–198.
 Crisis of the Imamate and the Institution of Occultation in Twelver Shi`ism: a Sociohistorical Perspective, International Journal of Middle East Studies 28.4 (1996): pp. 491–515.
 The Consolation of Theology: The Shi`ite Doctrine of Occultation and the Transition from Chiliasm to Law, 76.4 (1996): pp. 548–571.
 Islamic Apocalypticism in the Classical Period, in B. McGinn, ed., The Encyclopedia of Apocalypticism, New York: Continuum, vol. 2, 1998, pp. 238–283.
 The Law, Agency and Policy in Medieval Islamic Society: Development of the Institutions of Learning from the Tenth to the Fifteenth Century, Comparative Studies in Society and History, 41.2 (1999), pp 263–293.
 Civil Society and the Rule of Law in the Constitutional Politics of Iran under Khatami, Social Research, 76.2 (2000), pp. 283–301.
 Authority in Shi`ism and Constitutional Developments in the Islamic Republic of Iran, in W. Ende & R. Brunner, eds., The Twelver Shia in Modern Times: Religious Culture & Political History, Leiden: Brill, 2000, pp. 301–332.
 Perso-Indian Statecraft, Greek Political Science and the Muslim Idea of Government, International Sociology, 16.3 (2001), pp. 461–480.
 Social Theory and the Changing World: Mass Democracy, Development, Modernization and Globalization, International Sociology, 19.3 (2004), pp. 321–53.
 Coffeehouses, Guilds & Oriental Despotism: Government & Civil Society in late-17th-early 18th Century Istanbul and Isfahan, and as seen from Paris & London, Archives européennes de sociologie/European Journal of Sociology, 45.1 (2004), pp. 23–42.
 Rationalization, the Constitution of Meaning and Institutional Development, in C. Camic & H. Joas, eds., The Dialogical Turn. New Roles for Sociology in the Post-Disciplinary Age, Rowman & Littlefield, 2004, pp. 247–74.
 Islam, Political Change and Globalization, Thesis Eleven, 76 (2004), pp. 5–24.
 Developmental Patterns and Processes in Islamicate Civilization and the Impact of Modernization, in Hans Joas & Barbro Klein, eds., The Benefit Of Broad Horizons: Intellectual And Institutional Preconditions For A Global Social Science,Leiden: Brill, 2010, pp. 205–26.
 Legitimacy and Political Organisation: Caliphs, Kings and Regimes,” being Ch. 7 of The New Cambridge History of Islam, vol. 4 (R. Irwin, ed.; M. Cook, ed.-in-chief), 2010, pp. 225–73.
 Legitimacy and Political Organisation: Caliphs, Kings and Regimes,” being Ch. 7 of The New Cambridge History of Islam, vol. 4 (R. Irwin, ed.; M. Cook, ed.-in-chief), 2010, pp. 225–73.
 The Kingdom of Jurists: Constitutionalism in Iran, in Constitutionalism in Islamic Countries: Between Upheaval and Continuity (eds. Rainer Grote and Tilmann Röder, Oxford/New York: OUP, 2011.

References

External links
Development of Persian Sufism: Prof. Amir Arjomand speech at ASPS 2018 Confgerence (VIDEO)

Stony Brook University faculty
University of Chicago alumni
Middle Eastern studies in the United States
American foreign policy writers
American male non-fiction writers
American sociologists
American Muslims
Iranian expatriate academics
American people of Iranian descent
Islam and politics
American Islamic studies scholars
Living people
Academic journal editors
Year of birth missing (living people)
Place of birth missing (living people)
Iranologists